Alan Thomas Rutherford (born 2 June 1967) is a former Irish cricketer. He was a right-handed batsman and a wicket-keeper who was born at Strabane in County Tyrone. He made his debut for Ireland against Northamptonshire in 1989, and went on to play for his country on 47 occasions, including four first-class and nine List A matches.

He played for Ireland at the 1997 ICC Trophy, the 2000 ICC Emerging Nations Tournament in 2000, and at the European Championship in 1996 and 2000. The 2000 European Championship would be his last appearance for Ireland. He also represented Northern Ireland in the cricket tournament at the 1998 Commonwealth Games.

References

1967 births
Living people
Irish cricketers
Cricketers from Northern Ireland
Cricketers at the 1998 Commonwealth Games
Commonwealth Games competitors for Northern Ireland
People from County Tyrone
Wicket-keepers